Sir Samuel Roberts, 1st Baronet PC, DL (30 April 1852 – 19 June 1926) was a British politician and businessman.

Biography

Roberts was the son of Samuel Roberts, of Sheffield. A descendant of the Samuel Roberts who built Queen's Tower in Norfolk Park, Roberts grew up in the building and attended Repton School, Trinity College, Cambridge and then Inner Temple, becoming a barrister in 1877.

He became a director of Cammell Laird and of the National Provincial Bank, and was in business in Sheffield. In 1900, he was the Lord Mayor of Sheffield. At the 1900 general election he stood unsuccessfully for the Conservative Party in High Peak, but was elected at the Sheffield Ecclesall by-election in February 1902. He was knighted in 1917 and made a Baronet in 1919.  Becoming a Privy Councillor in 1922 under the Conservative Government, he stepped down from Parliament at the 1923 general election.

He was also a member of the Wanderers amateur football club.

Family
Roberts married, 21 December 1880, Martha Susan Blakeney, only daughter of Venerable John Edward Blakeney, Archdeacon of Sheffield. Their son, also Samuel Roberts, was a later MP for Sheffield Ecclesall.

References

Michael Stenton and Stephen Lees, Who's Who of British MPs: Volume III, 1919–1945

External links 
 

1852 births
1926 deaths
Alumni of Trinity College, Cambridge
Baronets in the Baronetage of the United Kingdom
Deputy Lieutenants of the West Riding of Yorkshire
Knights Bachelor
Lord Mayors of Sheffield
Members of the Inner Temple
Members of the Privy Council of the United Kingdom
Conservative Party (UK) MPs for English constituencies
People educated at Repton School
UK MPs 1900–1906
UK MPs 1906–1910
UK MPs 1910
UK MPs 1910–1918
UK MPs 1918–1922
UK MPs 1922–1923
Wanderers F.C. players
Association footballers not categorized by position
English footballers